The Hoover Cyclecar was a cyclecar manufactured by H. H. Hoover in St. Louis, Missouri; a company was established to manufacture the vehicle in October 1913. It was a two-passenger vehicle powered by a single-cylinder,  engine.

It is uncertain how many of the vehicles were produced.

References

Cyclecars
Cars introduced in 1913
Motor vehicles manufactured in the United States
Brass Era vehicles